The 1881–82 season was the ninth season of competitive football in Scotland.

Honours

Cup honours

National

County 

After Hibernian won the Edinburgh FA Cup on three successive seasons, they were awarded it outright, and a new trophy, the East of Scotland Shield would in future be played for by Edinburgh clubs.

Other

Teams in F.A. Cup

Scotland national team

Notes

References

External links
Scottish Football Historical Archive

 
Seasons in Scottish football